Bethel, Arkansas may refer to:
 Bethel, Clark County, Arkansas
 Bethel, Columbia County, Arkansas
 Bethel, Greene County, Arkansas
 Bethel, Pope County, Arkansas

or

 Bethel Grove, Arkansas in Washington County
 Bethel Heights, Arkansas in Benton County